Piazza Samsun is a shopping mall located on Çarşamba Caddesi in Samsun, Turkey. It serves the Samsun area and is also the Central Black Sea's premier shopping Center and Largest Mall with 160 stores. Piazza Samsun was completed in 2013 by the Rönesans Development Group. The mall contains a 164 room Anemon Hotel on the south end of the structure. 

The mall contains 160 stores and the anchor stores are Media Markt, Migros (Turkey) and Cinemaximum. The mall was designed by Tabanlıoğlu Architects.

History
Piazza Samsun is the first large retail development by Rönesans Development Group. Construction started in October 2011 and took 16 months to complete. The mall opened to visitors in March 2013. The mall is the largest in the Black Sea Region of Turkey. The mall is 1,506,947 sf of which 700,000 sf is leasable area. Since the opening of the mall it has become the focal point of retail activity in Samsun Province. The mall was constructed by Atalar Construction. 

The mall cost 300 million TL to construct. Piazza hosts 13 million visitors annually and employs 2,500 people. Samsun Piazza was awarded the Honor Award in the 'Large Shopping Center' category by the International Council of Shopping Centers (ICSC) in 2014.

Retail  
Piazza hosts 160 domestic and foreign brands in total. Media Markt, 5M Migros, Zara, H&M, Decathlon, Cinemaximum, Lacoste, Hakimi, Starbucks, Tommy Hilfiger, Cook Shop, Macfit are among the tenants of the shopping center. Piazza also has a hotel, a multiplex cinema, and a 16,150 sf public outdoor terrace.

The mall is serviced by the Samsunspor Station of the Samsun Tram. Piazza is strategically located on Çarşamba Caddesi to the east of Samsun's City Center.

Gallery

References

External links
Piazza Samsun

Shopping malls in Turkey
Samsun
Shopping malls established in 2013